The Parsonages (Amendment) Act 1838 (1 & 2 Vict. c. 29) was an Act of Parliament in the United Kingdom, signed into law on 4 July 1838. It amended the Parsonages Act 1838, passed that May, by correcting a verbal omission in section 7.

References
The British almanac of the Society for the Diffusion of Useful Knowledge, for the year 1839. The Society for the Diffusion of Useful Knowledge, London, 1839.

1838 in British law
United Kingdom Acts of Parliament 1838